Santa Luċija is a village in the Southern Region of Malta, with a population of 2,997 as of March 2014. It is one of the modern towns developed in Malta during the 20th century. By virtue of an article which appeared in Government Gazette of 7 July 1961 the area between Tal-Barrani (Tarxien By-Pass) and Luqa By-Pass. Santa Luċija was named after a 16th-century chapel located in the vicinity.  The Parish Church is dedicated to Pope Pius X. It is home of the Chinese Garden of Serenity (a Chinese-built public garden). Located there is a hypogeum which was discovered in 1973.

Attractions and places of interest
 Chinese Garden of Serenity, a Chinese traditional garden
 Sphere of Life, a commemorative monument by Paul Vella Critien
Votive Column, a monument representing fertility

Zones in Santa Luċija
Bir-Ġurat
Roqba
Sqajjaq t'Isfel
Ta' Garnaw
Ta' Garriba
Taċ-Ċagħki
Tal-Lampat
Tax-Xewk

Main Roads
Dawret it-Torri (Tower By-Pass)
Triq Katarina Vitale (Catherine Vitale Street)
Triq Marija DeDominicis (Maria De Dominicas Street)
Triq Ħal-Luqa (Luqa Road)
Triq il-Begonja (Begonia Street)
Triq il-Pepprin (Poppies Street)
Triq il-Prinjoli (Aleppo Pine Street)
Triq Tal-Barrani (Tal-Barrani Road)
Vjal l-Oleandri (Oleandri Avenue)

Twin towns – sister cities

Santa Luċija is twinned with:
 Carlentini, Italy
 Gabiano, Italy
 Gusu District, China

References

External links
Santa Luċija Local Council

 
Towns in Malta
Local councils of Malta